The Political Classroom: Evidence and Ethics in Democratic Education is a 2014 book by Diana Hess and Paula McAvoy on the role of politics in American classrooms, both in teaching controversial issues and teachers sharing their own views. It is based on a study of 1000 students across 35 schools and 21 teachers between 2005 and 2009.

References

Further reading

External links 
 
 Publisher website

2014 non-fiction books
Books about education
Routledge books